Roberto Carlos de la Rosa González (born 4 January 2000) is a Mexican professional footballer who plays as a forward for Liga MX club Pachuca.

Club career
Born in Texcoco, State of Mexico, de la Rosa began playing football in the Pachuca's youth system. Manager Diego Alonso eventually brought him into the senior club and made his professional debut on 12 August 2017 in a Liga MX match against Tigres UANL, coming on as a substitute in a 2–1 victory. On 16 December, he scored in the 2017 FIFA Club World Cup third place match against hosts Al-Jazira in a 4–1 win, making him the youngest player to ever score in a FIFA Club World Cup. On 26 February 2019, he scored his first professional goal in a Copa MX round of 16 match against América in a 5–2 loss. On 23 November, he scored his first league goals, a brace against Pumas UNAM in a 2–0 win.

International career
In April 2019, de la Rosa was included in the 21-player squad to represent Mexico at the U-20 World Cup in Poland.

Career statistics

Club

Honours
Pachuca
Liga MX: Apertura 2022

Mexico U17
CONCACAF U-17 Championship: 2017

References

2000 births
Living people
People from Texcoco, State of Mexico
Association football forwards
Mexico youth international footballers
C.F. Pachuca players
Liga MX players
Footballers from the State of Mexico
Mexico under-20 international footballers
Mexican footballers